Mariscal Castilla (Spanish mariscal marshal) is a district of the Chachapoyas Province, Peru.

Districts of the Amazonas Region
Districts of the Chachapoyas Province
1904 establishments in Peru